Alex Henrique José (born March 20, 1985) is a Brazilian football player who currently plays as a midfielder for Aparecidense.

Club statistics

References

External links

1985 births
Living people
Brazilian footballers
Campeonato Brasileiro Série B players
Campeonato Brasileiro Série C players
Campeonato Brasileiro Série D players
J2 League players
Alex Henrique
Avispa Fukuoka players
Thespakusatsu Gunma players
Tokyo Verdy players
Agremiação Sportiva Arapiraquense players
Alex Henrique
Comercial Futebol Clube (Ribeirão Preto) players
Centro Sportivo Alagoano players
América Futebol Clube (RN) players
Moto Club de São Luís players
Associação Atlética Aparecidense players
Vila Nova Futebol Clube players
Sampaio Corrêa Futebol Clube players
Esporte Clube Pelotas players
Associação Desportiva Confiança players
Brazilian expatriate footballers
Expatriate footballers in Japan
Expatriate footballers in Thailand
Brazilian expatriate sportspeople in Japan
Brazilian expatriate sportspeople in Thailand
Association football midfielders
Footballers from São Paulo